The New Beginning in Sapporo (2019) was a professional wrestling event promoted by New Japan Pro-Wrestling (NJPW). The event took place on February 2, and 3, 2019, in Sapporo, Hokkaido, at the Hokkaido Prefectural Sports Center.

Storylines
The New Beginning in Sapporo featured eight professional wrestling matches for each night, which involved different wrestlers from pre-existing scripted feuds and storylines. Wrestlers portrayed villains, heroes, or less distinguishable characters in the scripted events that built tension and culminated in a wrestling match or series of matches.

Results

Night 1

Night 2

References

External links
The New Beginning at NJPW.co.jp

2019 in professional wrestling
February 2019 events in Japan
NJPW The New Beginning
Events in Sapporo
Professional wrestling in Japan